Kingsbury Plantation is a plantation in Piscataquis County, Maine, United States. The plantation was named for Judge Sanford Kingsbury, a landowner. As of the 2020 census, the plantation had a total population of 28.

History 
The area that now contains the plantation was originally part of the Bingham Purchase and was purchased by Judge Sanford Kingsbury in 1833 for $4,000. Judge Kingsbury built two mills on Kingsbury Pond in 1835, and the area grew quickly enough that on March 22, 1836 it was incorporated as the town of Kingsbury. By the 1880s, the town had a store, hotel, church, and two schoolhouses. In 1886, the town disbanded, and it reorganized as a plantation in 1887. The reorganization as a plantation was validated by the state legislature in 1895.

Geography 
The plantation includes Foss Pond in the north, part of Whetstone Pond in the northeast, and part of Kingsbury Pond in the southwest. The 1,532-ft high Foss Mountain is located in the plantation.

Demographics 

As of the census of 2000, there were 9 people, 6 households, and 1 family residing in the plantation. The population density was 0.2 people per square mile (0.1/km2). There were 139 housing units at an average density of 3.1 per square mile (1.2/km2). The racial makeup of the plantation was 8 White and 1 from two or more races.

There were 6 households, out of which 2 were married couples living together and 4 were non-families. 3 households were made up of individuals, and 3 had someone living alone who was 65 years of age or older. The average household size was 1.50 and the average family size was 2.00.

In the plantation the population was spread out, with 1 between 25 and 44, 3 from 45 to 64, and 5 ages 65 years of age or older. The median age was 70 years.

References

External links
Kingsbury Plantation Website

Plantations in Piscataquis County, Maine
Plantations in Maine